
Year 153 BC was a year of the pre-Julian Roman calendar. At the time it was known as the Year of the Consulship of Nobilior and Luscus (or, less frequently, year 601 Ab urbe condita). The denomination 153 BC for this year has been used since the early medieval period, when the Anno Domini calendar era became the prevalent method in Europe for naming years.

Events 
 By place 

 Roman Republic 
 The uprisings in Rome's Hispanic provinces oblige the year's consuls to take office earlier than the traditional date of 25 March, a change that becomes permanent. Some suggest that, as a consequence, January 1 becomes the first day of the Roman year.

 Seleucid Empire 
 The Seleucid king Demetrius I Soter's relations with Attalus II Philadelphus of Pergamum and Ptolemy VI Philometor of Egypt deteriorate to the point where they support a rival claimant to the Syrian throne, Alexander Balas, who claims to be the son of the former Seleucid king Antiochus IV Epiphanes and, therefore, a first cousin of Demetrius. He has been "discovered" by Heracleides, a former minister of Antiochus IV and brother of Timarchus, who has been executed by Demetrius I Soter in 160 BC after leading a revolt against him in Media.
 As a result of the rise of the pretender, Alexander Balas, Demetrius I Soter is forced to recall most of his garrisons in Judea. To retain control of Judea, he makes a bid to gain the loyalty of Jonathan Maccabeus, whom he permits to recruit an army and to take back the hostages that the Syrians are holding in the city of Acre. Jonathan gladly accepts these terms, takes up residence in Jerusalem and begins to fortify the city, becoming High Priest of Jerusalem until 143 BC.

 Greece 
 Substantial parts of the city of Sikyon are destroyed by an earthquake.

Deaths

References